"Free to Be Me" was released as the second single from American Contemporary Christian music singer Francesca Battistelli's major label debut album, My Paper Heart, in January 2009. The song was certified Gold in the U.S. by the RIAA on April 21, 2014.

Background
"Free to Be Me" was released in January 2009, although there has not been a specified date. The song has been compared to the works of fellow Christian music artist Sarah Kelly. It features a background of "thick" drums, bass, piano and electronic organ. Along with being featured on My Paper Heart, it has been featured on WOW Hits 2010, Now That's What I Call Faith, WOW Number 1s: Yellow, and Wow: Six Decades of Hits. The music video was released on March 2, 2010.

Critical reception
John Fisher of Cross Rhythms said, "This young lady is not afraid to look at life's highs and lows from a very personal angle." Katie R. of Teen Ink stated that it was "easy to listen to and extremely uplifting". Rich Smith of Louder Than The Music called it a "stand out track".

Awards
The song was nominated for three Dove Awards: "Song of the Year", "Short Form Music Video of the Year", and "Pop/Contemporary Recorded Song of the Year" at the 41st GMA Dove Awards, and won an award under the "Short Form Music Video of the Year" category.

Personnel 
 Francesca Battistelli – vocals 
 Tim Lauer – keyboards 
 Aaron Shannon – additional programming 
 Mike Payne – guitars 
 Tony Lucido – bass 
 Scott Williamson – drums

Charts

Certifications

References

2008 singles
Song recordings produced by Ian Eskelin
Francesca Battistelli songs
Songs written by Francesca Battistelli